"Streiht Up Menace" is the debut single by MC Eiht off the soundtrack of 1993 movie Menace II Society.  The lyrics of the song focus on the life of the main character in the movie, Kaydee "Caine" Lawson (Tyrin Turner),   acting as a sort of plot summary for the film. Compton's Most Wanted also did this with another song from a soundtrack with the song "Growin' Up In The Hood" from the Boyz n the Hood soundtrack.
The track was later released on the 2001 Compton's Most Wanted compilation album "When We Wuz Bangin" and on the 2010 MC Eiht compilation album "The Best Of MC Eiht".

Video
The video for "Streiht Up Menace" depicts MC Eiht alone in a slightly foggy bedroom. The video also features clips from the movie.

Legacy 
Montell Jordan's "Falling" from his second album, "More..." (1996) sampled "Streiht up Menace" as did "Rapfilm" by Kool Savas (2009). The song is featured in the in-game radio station West Coast Classics in the 2013 video game Grand Theft Auto V. In 2010, Bruno Mars did a wedding remix of MC Eiht's Straight Up Menace on his debut album Doo-Wops & Hooligans.

References

1993 songs
Jive Records singles
1993 singles
Gangsta rap songs